Plas Power (WMCQR) railway station was a station in Southsea, Wrexham, Wales. The station was opened on 1 August 1889, closed to passengers on 1 March 1917 and closed completely on 2 April 1956.

References

Disused railway stations in Wrexham County Borough
Railway stations in Great Britain opened in 1889
Railway stations in Great Britain closed in 1917
Former Great Central Railway stations